Kruse v Johnson [1898] 2 QB 91 is a UK administrative law case, concerning the judicial review of decisions by public bodies. It is notable as Lord Russell CJ established the principle that if a measure were to indirectly discriminate between classes, it could be declared void. According to him, if rules under authority of an Act of Parliament,

Facts
Kent County Council made a bylaw, under authority of the Local Government Act 1888 section 16, that nobody, after being requested to stop by a constable, could play music or sing within 50 yards of a dwelling house in an public place or highway. The claimant had been singing a hymn within 50 yards of a dwelling house, and had refused to stop after a constable had told him to do so. He was given a penalty, and sought judicial review to declare that the bylaw was void.

Judgment
Lord Russell CJ, giving the court's leading judgment, held the bylaw was valid on the ground that it was not unreasonable, because it did not have a discriminatory impact on the population. He said the following.

Matthew J dissented.

Chitty LJ, Wright J, Darling J, and Channell J concurred with Lord Russell CJ.

See also
UK administrative law
UK constitutional law
Equality Act 2010
Matadeen v Pointu [1998] UKPC 9

Notes

References

United Kingdom administrative case law
United Kingdom constitutional case law
1898 in British law
1898 in case law